The Staufen is a 1465 metre high mountain in the very western part of Austria. The mountaintop splits the two bordering cities, Dornbirn and Hohenems. The Staufen is connected to the Karren, which belongs to the city of Dornbirn.

Mountains of Vorarlberg
Bregenz Forest Mountains
Mountains of the Alps